The Umbrella Coup is a 1980 French comedy film directed by Gérard Oury, starring Pierre Richard, Gordon Mitchell and Gert Fröbe.

The creation of the film was inspired by several assassinations of Bulgarian dissidents where the so-called Bulgarian umbrella was used as a weapon. The working title of the film was Le Coup du Parapluie Bulgare.

It was shot the Epinay Studios and on location around Paris. The film's sets were designed by the art director Jean André.

Plot
The unsuccessful actor Grégoire Lecomte is heading for a casting but then he takes a wrong turn. While he thinks he talks to casting director who wants an actor to play a henchman, he actually talks to a mafia don who wants a real killer.
Lecomte's performance is convincing and consequently he receives a contract to finish off arms dealer Otto Krampe. He is supposed to kill Krampe with an umbrella containing a built-in syringe full of potassium cyanide at his birthday party in St-Tropez. Lecomte takes the don for a producer and believes this was all part of shooting a film.

Cast
Pierre Richard as Grégoire Lecomte
Gordon Mitchell as Moskovitz
Valérie Mairesse as Sylvette  Bunny
Christine Murillo as Josyane Leblanc
Gert Fröbe as Otto Krampe a.k.a. Whale
Gérard Jugnot as Frédo
Vittorio Caprioli as Don Barberini
Yaseen Khan as Radj Kahn
Didier Sauvegrain as Stanislas Lefort a.k.a. Crazy
Mike Marshall as the Doctor
Roger Carel as Salvatore Bozzoni
Dominique Lavanant as Mireille
Maurice Risch as the Producer

See also
Never a Dull Moment (1968)

References

External links

 
The Umbrella Coup/Le Coup du parapluie at the Cinemovies site
The Umbrella Coup overview at the New York Times

1980 films
French crime comedy films
Films about contract killing
Films directed by Gérard Oury
Films scored by Vladimir Cosma
Films set in Saint-Tropez
French comedy films
1980s French-language films
Mafia comedy films
1980s screwball comedy films
1980s crime comedy films
1980 comedy films
Gaumont Film Company films
Films shot at Epinay Studios
1980s American films
1980s French films